Rampage 2 may refer to:

 Rampage 2: Universal Tour, a 1999 video game
 Rampage: Capital Punishment, the sequel to the Uwe Boll film Rampage